Bernds Hexe (English: Bernd's witch) is a German comedy television series about a banker who is married to a witch. The series is a joint venture between Cologne Filmproduktion GmbH and Grundy Light Entertainment. It aired on RTL in 39 episodes between 2002 and 2005.

DVD
On 18 September 2006 RTL DVD released the first two seasons on DVD.

See also
List of German television series

External links
 

German comedy television series
2002 German television series debuts
2005 German television series endings
RTL (German TV channel) original programming
German-language television shows